John Richard "Dick" Wynyard (10 May 1885 – 7 April 1915) was a New Zealand rugby footballer who was part of the professional 1907-1908 New Zealand rugby tour of Great Britain. Richard was the brother of William Wynyard. He had 2 sisters, Kathleen Amelia Wynyard (1887-1965), and Audrey Gertrude Wynyard (1892-1920), and 2 brothers, Leslie Henry (Hec) Wynyard (1889-1985), and Sydney Montague Wynyard (1894-1953)

Early years
From a sporting family that included three uncles that were part of the 1888-1889 New Zealand Native football team that toured Great Britain. One of these three, Tabby Wynyard went on the represent the All Blacks. Richard followed his family tradition, becoming a noted rugby union player and a civil servant clerk.

Rugby Football
Living in Devonport, Wynyard was part of the North Shore Rugby Club and won selection for Auckland when aged only 20. In 1907 he was nominated for the North Island team but did not play after he, along with eleven other Auckland nominations, refused to sign a declaration that he would remain an amateur player.

Rugby League
Wynyard was then selected to be part of the professional All Blacks 1907-08 tour of Australia and Great Britain alongside his brother Billy. Wynyard had to resign his government job to be part of the tour, but the move paid off as he ended up playing in all eight test matches. Out of the 49 tour matches Richard played in 44 of them, more than any other player. He scored 28 tries and kicked a goal and a field goal.

Unlike many of the touring party he remained in New Zealand after the tour, captaining Auckland in the first ever provincial match against Wellington on 24 August 1908. He, along with his brother, later helped form the North Shore Albions Rugby League Club - which broke away from the North Shore Rugby Club.

Death   
Richard committed suicide in 1915 in Auckland by cutting his throat; he was despondent as he had been unable to find work as a clerk, and the coroner’s verdict was temporary insanity. He was buried at Belmont on the North Shore of Auckland.
 
 He was unmarried and had no children.

References

1885 births
1915 deaths
1915 suicides
Auckland rugby league team players
Auckland rugby union players
New Zealand rugby league players
New Zealand rugby union players
New Zealand national rugby league team players
New Zealand public servants
North Shore Albions players
Rugby league halfbacks
Rugby league players from Auckland
Suicides in New Zealand

Suicides by sharp instrument